Azovsky Nemetsky (German) National District is an administrative and municipal district (raion), one of the thirty-two in Omsk Oblast, Russia. It is located in the south of the oblast. Its administrative center is the rural locality (a selo) of Azovo. In the Russian Census of 2010, the population was 22,925. The population of Azovo accounts for 26.2% of the district's total population.

History
The first villages in what is now Azovsky Nemetsky National District were founded in 1893 by the Volga Germans.

Politics
Heads of the district administration were Bruno Heinrich Reuters (1992-2010) and Viktor Sabelfeld (2010-present).

Demographics
The population of the district as of January 1, 2007 was 22,246, of which 56% were Germans, 24% Russians, 8.3% Kazakhs, and 6.8% Ukrainians.

Being considered cultural heritage, and in order for the Azovsky Nemetsky National District to be a refuge for the dispersed and diminished Russlanddeutsche, the German language is officially endorsed, i.e., protected, supported and promoted.

See also
History of Germans in Russia and the Soviet Union

References

Notes

Sources

Districts of Omsk Oblast
Volga German diaspora
Russian and Soviet-German people
German communities in Russia
States and territories established in 1992